Ginásio C.F. is a professional basketball team based in Figueira da Foz, Portugal. It plays in the second-tier Proliga. In 1977, it won the first-tier LPB.

Achievements
 Liga Portuguesa de Basquetebol: 1 (1976/77)
 Portuguese Basketball Cup: 1 (1976/77)
 Portuguese Basketball Champions Tournament: 1 (2003/04)
 II Divisão Basquetebol: 3 (1968/69, 1987/88, 1991/92)

Notable players

 Rodrigo Mascarenhas

References

External links
Eurobasket.com team page

Basketball teams in Portugal
Sport in Figueira da Foz